The OneAsia Tour was a men's professional golf tour based in the Asia-Pacific region. The tour was founded in 2009 as a joint venture between the PGA Tour of Australasia, the China Golf Association, the Korean Golf Association and the Korean PGA. The Japan Golf Tour was invited to participate in the project in 2012 and has co-sanctioned the Indonesia Open, Indonesia PGA Championship and Thailand Open. OneAsia was seen as a rival to the longer established Asian Tour, with which it had poor relations. From 2010 to 2017, the OneAsia Tour had world ranking status in its own right.

Having had a ten tournament schedule in each of its first few seasons, OneAsia's fortunes began to decline. Being reliant on co-sanctioning arrangements to fill out the calendar – only one event was not co-sanctioned in 2013 and 2014 – tour members were afforded a limited number of places in the tournaments. In 2015, there were just seven tournaments, all co-sanctioned. In 2016, there were just four, and one fewer in 2017. Early in 2018, having not hosted a sole-sanctioned event for three years, OneAsia lost its right to offer world ranking points.

Early 2018 saw an extensive restructuring of the organisation with a new management team put in place in an attempt to revive the tour. A Q School was organised, but due to the lack of status of the tour, having lost world ranking points, and without any calendar of tournaments, there were less than 20 entrants. To start the new season OneAsia co-sanctioned the Solaire Philippine Open and had plans for a further four tournaments in 2018, but these were not played. One tournament was scheduled for 2019, but ultimately no tournaments were played.

Formation
In January 2009, it was announced that there would be a new series of events across the Asia-Pacific region, to be organised by the PGA of Australia in co-operation with China Golf Association, the Japan Golf Tour, the Korean Golf Association and the Korean PGA. The aim of these events would be to raise the profile of professional golf in the region and to compete with the likes of the European Tour. The series would initially comprise six events, three in China, two in Australia and one in South Korea, with plans to expand in later years.

The introduction of the OneAsia series was not welcomed by the Asian Tour. All of the six events announced for 2009 were existing tournaments, including some already sanctioned by the Asian Tour. One of them, the Pine Valley Beijing Open, was called off a few weeks before it was due to be held. The organisers officially attributed this decision to the state of the course and a clash of dates with The Players Championship on the PGA Tour, but some media commentators dismissed these reasons since the tournament had clashed with the Players Championship the previous year as well and instead attributed the cancellation to sponsor discontent with the sanctioning changes.

Following a meeting of the Official World Golf Rankings Committee (OWGR) at the Open Championship in July 2009, all OneAsia events were awarded Official World Golf Ranking points. In May 2018, the OWGR revoked the Tour's world ranking eligibility.

2018 season

Schedule
The following table lists official events during the 2018 season.

Order of Merit
The Order of Merit was based on prize money won during the season, calculated in U.S. dollars.

2017 season

Schedule
The following table lists official events during the 2017 season.

Order of Merit
The Order of Merit was based on prize money won during the season, calculated in U.S. dollars.

2016 season

Schedule
The following table lists official events during the 2016 season.

Order of Merit
The Order of Merit was based on prize money won during the season, calculated in U.S. dollars.

2015 season

Schedule
The following table lists official events during the 2015 season.

Order of Merit
The Order of Merit was based on prize money won during the season, calculated in U.S. dollars.

2014 season

Schedule
The following table lists official events during the 2014 season.

Order of Merit
The Order of Merit was based on prize money won during the season, calculated in U.S. dollars.

2013 season

Schedule
The following table lists official events during the 2013 season.

Order of Merit
The Order of Merit was based on prize money won during the season, calculated in U.S. dollars.

2012 season

Schedule
The following table lists official events during the 2012 season.

Order of Merit
The Order of Merit was based on prize money won during the season, calculated in U.S. dollars.

2011 season

Schedule
The following table lists official events during the 2011 season.

Order of Merit
The Order of Merit was based on prize money won during the season, calculated in U.S. dollars.

2010 season

Schedule
The following table lists official events during the 2010 season.

Order of Merit
The Order of Merit was based on prize money won during the season, calculated in U.S. dollars.

2009 season

Schedule
The following table lists official events during the 2009 season.

Order of Merit
The Order of Merit was based on prize money won during the season, calculated in U.S. dollars.

Order of Merit winners

Notes

References

External links

Professional golf tours
Golf in Australia
Golf in China
Golf in South Korea
Recurring sporting events established in 2009